The 1994 McDonald's All-American Boys Game was an All-star basketball game played on Sunday, April 3, 1994 at Carnesecca Arena in Jamaica, New York. The game's rosters featured the best and most highly recruited high school boys graduating in 1994. The game was the 17th annual version of the McDonald's All-American Game first played in 1978.

1994 game
The game was telecast live by CBS. The East team included many guards, while the West could rely on more forwards and centers. Trajan Langdon became the first McDonald's All-American from the state of Alaska. Felipe López, the local fan favorite, was named the MVP of the game, having scored 24 points. Other players who starred were Zendon Hamilton, Kareem Reid, Antoine Walker and Jerod Ward. The game score was close, and the West almost completed a comeback, led by Andrae Patterson who scored many points in the last minutes. Of the 22 players, 10 went on to play in the NBA.

East roster

West roster

Coaches
The East team was coached by:
 Head Coach Jack Curran of Archbishop Molloy High School (Queens, New York)

The West team was coached by:
 Coached by Vince Clemons of Merced High School

All-American Week

Contest winners 
 The 1994 Slam Dunk contest was won by Ricky Price.
 The 1994 3-point shoot-out was won by Trajan Langdon.

References

External links
McDonald's All-American on the web
McDonald's All-American all-time rosters
McDonald's All-American rosters at Basketball-Reference.com
Game stats at Realgm.com

1993–94 in American basketball
1994